SOCOM U.S. Navy SEALs is a series of third-person tactical shooter video games for the PlayStation 2, PlayStation 3 and PlayStation Portable created by Zipper Interactive and released between 2002 and 2011. The title for the series comes from the United States Special Operations Command (SOCOM) which is a Unified Combatant Command. The games focus on various teams of United States Navy SEALs (an operating component under SOCOM) completing missions with occasional help from other special operations forces from around the world such as the SAS, SBS and GROM.

Games

SOCOM U.S. Navy SEALs (2002)

SOCOM was one of the earliest titles to use the PS2's online service in North America.

SOCOM II (2003)

A direct sequel for the PlayStation 2 with online play.

SOCOM 3 (2005)

Updated version of the franchise for the PlayStation 2.

SOCOM: Fireteam Bravo (2005)

The first game in the series released exclusively for the PlayStation Portable.

SOCOM: Combined Assault (2006)

For the PlayStation 2, this game allowed players to play the story mode online.

SOCOM: Fireteam Bravo 2 (2006)

An exclusive to the PlayStation Portable.

SOCOM: Tactical Strike (2007)

Exclusively for the PlayStation Portable, the gameplay became less run-and-gun and more command and strategic.

SOCOM: Confrontation (2008)

Confrontation is an online-focused game and the first title for the PlayStation 3.

SOCOM: Fireteam Bravo 3 (2010)

The final entry in the PlayStation Portable line Fireteam Bravo.

SOCOM 4 (2011)

The second title for the PlayStation 3 and the latest title in the franchise, SOCOM 4 is set in Malaysia and serves as the sequel to SOCOM 3.

References

External links

 
Sony Interactive Entertainment franchises
Video game franchises introduced in 2002